Berend Strik (born 26 April 1960) is a Dutch visual artist working and living in Amsterdam.

Biography
Berend Strik grew up in Nijmegen, Netherlands. From 1986 until 1988 he studied at the Rijksakademie (Royal Academy of Visual Arts) in Amsterdam. From 1998 until 2000 he followed the International Studio & Curatorial Program (ISCP) in New York. In 2001 he was "artist in residence" at Het Vijfde Seizoen (The Fifth Season) in Den Dolder, Netherlands.

Strik has been awarded several national and international prizes, including the 1987 Prix de Rome (second prize, sculpture), the 1990 Charlotte Köhler Award and the 1992 Dorothea von Stetten Art Award.

The work of Berend Strik has been exhibited extensively, both in solo and group exhibitions. In 1994 Strik had a solo exhibition at the Stedelijk Museum Amsterdam called Sadness, Sluices, Mermaids, Delay. In 2010/2011 The Valkhof Museum (Nijmegen) presented a retrospective exhibition, called May I Show You My Pictures?, accompanied by a publication of the same title.
Strik’s work has also been exhibited internationally in several exhibitions. In 2007/2008 it formed part of the group exhibition PRICKED! EXTREME EMBROIDERY at the Museum of Arts and Design (New York).  This exhibition presented the work of 48 artists from 17 countries, who applied the technique of embroidery in their work in various different ways. The Mudam (Luxembourg) exhibited Strik’s work in 2010 as part of the group exhibition Just love me, together with work by Donald Judd, Mike Kelley, Sigmar Polke, Gerhard Richter en Luc Tuymans, amongst others.

In 2012, Boris Gerrets filmed a studio portrait of Berend Strik, as part of the Hollandse Meesters in de 21e eeuw project (Dutch Masters of the 21st century), in which renowned filmmakers followed the most important Dutch artists of today in their studios.
Several museums have acquired Strik’s works for their collections, including the Amsterdam Stedelijk Museum Amsterdam, Museum Boijmans Van Beuningen, Valkhof Museum, Fries Museum, Schunck Cultural Centre, Museum Het Domein and Textiel Museum.
The work of Berend Strik can also be found in several corporate collections, such as: Stichting Kunst & Historisch Bezit ABN AMRO, Achmea Kunstcollectie, AKZO Nobel Art Foundation, AMC Collectie, Bouwfonds Kunstcollectie, Kunstcollectie De Nederlandsche Bank and Rabo Kunstcollectie.

Work

Berend Strik has worked in several disciplines, ranging from two-dimensional works to sculpture and architecture. What he is best known for, however, is his embroidered works. Initially, Strik used found materials such as family album pictures and magazine pictures as his starting point. His more recent work uses pictures he took during his travels. Strik embroiders over the original image and adds pieces of cloth.

In 1994 Berend Strik, together with visual artist Hans van Houwelingen, designed new stained-glass windows for the Paradiso music venue in Amsterdam. These windows, called The modern morals, express contemporary interpretations of concepts like ‘Love’, ‘Marriage’, ‘The mother’, ‘Creation’, and ‘Death’. For the representation of contemporary marriage the artists chose Same-sex marriage; ‘The mother’ is portrayed as a highly pregnant career woman; the ‘Creation’ window displays cloned sheep Dolly.

In 2000, for the foyer of the TivoliVredenburg music venue in Utrecht, Berend Strik designed Electric Church, a tribute to Jimi Hendrix. This work consists of a recess behind a fence, the niche displaying pictures above a yellow bench of Jimi Hendrix and two of his band members.

In 2009 Berend Strik traveled to the West Bank and East Jerusalem, where he visited Jewish and Palestinian homes. The photographs he made there formed the starting point of several works both displaying insignificant scenes and revealing the tension felt throughout this region.

In 2010, commissioned by Vesteda, Strik produced 52 works in which he highlighted various aspects of the work of architect Álvaro Siza. These works are on display at the New Orleans residential tower designed by Siza, at the Wilhelminapier in Rotterdam.

Since 2012 Strik has been working on a series about the artist studio: Decipher the Artist’s Mind. For this series he visited and photographed studios of several artists, after which he edited the pictures. It is not so much the artists themselves that play a central role in this series, but rather the studios in which they work.

Solo exhibitions
 1991 - Pas de Deux (with Hans van Houwelingen), H.C.A.K., The Hague, Netherlands
 1994 - Sadness, Sluices, Mermaids, Delay, Stedelijk Museum, Amsterdam, Netherlands
 1998 - Berend Strik and One Architecture, De Vleeshal, Middelburg, Netherlands
 1999 - In the Tree, International Studio Program, New York, United States
 1999 - Good Morning Herbert, Fries Museum, Leeuwarden, Netherlands
 2002 - Ssssnnnniiiiffffff, Kabinett, Zürich, Switzerland
 2002 - Binz 39 (with One Architecture), Zürich, Switzerland
 2004 - Body Electric, Fries Museum, Leeuwarden, Netherlands
 2010 - Strik / Siza, New Orleans, Vesteda, Rotterdam, Netherlands
 2010 - May I Show You My Pictures, The Valkhof Museum, Nijmegen, Netherlands
 2011 - Crushed, Stitched and Transfixed, Oslo Museum, Gallery IKM, Norway
 2014 - Studio in the Studio, Heden, The Hague, Netherlands
 2014 - Exhibiting the Studio, Het Nieuwe Instituut, Rotterdam, Netherlands

Group exhibitions
 1987 - Prix de Rome, City Hall, Amsterdam, Netherlands
 1988 - Een Grote Activiteit, Stedelijk Museum, Amsterdam, Netherlands
 1989 - Capital Gains, Museum Fodor, Amsterdam, Netherlands
 1989 - Mik, Leijenaar, Strik, Museum Het Kruithuis, Den Bosch, Netherlands
 1992 - Welcome Stranger, Multimedia project in abandoned house, Amsterdam, Netherlands
 1993 - Dorothea von Stetten Kunstpreis, Kunstmuseum Bonn, Bonn, Germany
 1993 - Du fil repeindre, FRAC, Montpellier, France
 1993 - Scuola, Scuola di San Pasquale, Venice, Italy
 1993 - Vrij Spel, Gemeentemuseum, Arnhem, Netherlands
 1994 - Het Grote Gedicht (The Grand Poem). Dutch Sculpture 1945 - 1994, Grote Kerk (Great Church), The Hague, Netherlands
 1994 - Rendez Vous Provoqué, National Museum of History and Art, Luxembourg / Museum De Lakenhal, Leiden
 1995 - The Other Self, National Gallery of Modern Art, New Delhi, India
 1996 - Abendland, Städtische Ausstellungshalle, Münster, Germany
 1996 - The Other Self, Stedelijk Museum Bureau Amsterdam, Amsterdam, Netherlands
 1997 - Het Eigen Gezicht - Rijksakademie 1986-1997, a selection by Auke de Vries, Museum Beelden aan Zee, Scheveningen, Netherlands
 1997 - The People's Choice (with One Architecture), Kunsthal Rotterdam, Netherlands
 1998 - Vous Etes Ici: Silkscream Series, Kunstraum Neue Kunst, Hannover, Germany
 1999 - Trouble Spot. Painting, MuHKA/NICC, Antwerp, Belgium
 2000 - Biennale de Lyon, curated by Jean Hubert Martin, Lyon, France
 2000 - Japan, curated by Camiel van Winkel, De Vleeshal, Middelburg, Netherlands
 2001 - Pleidooi voor intuïtie, Gemeentemuseum Den Haag, The Hague, Netherlands
 2001 - The Presentation, Stedelijk Museum, Amsterdam, Netherlands
 2002 - It's Unfair, De Paviljoens, Almere, Netherlands
 2002 - Life in a glass house, Stedelijk Museum, Amsterdam, Netherlands
 2003 - Material Matters, Kunsthallen Brandts Klaedefabrik, Odense, Denmark
 2004 - Oogstrelend Schoon, CODA, Apeldoorn, Netherlands
 2004 - Secrets of the nineties, Museum voor Moderne Kunst, Arnhem, Netherlands
 2005 - Les Très Riches Heures, The Valkhof Museum, Nijmegen, Netherlands
 2005 - Slow Art, The Current Art Scene, Museum Kunst Palast, Düsseldorf, Germany
 2006 - Room with a view: De Bouwfonds Kunstcollectie, Gemeentemuseum Den Haag, The Hague
 2007 - A Faithful Eye: Modern and Contemporary Art from the Netherlands: The ABN AMRO Collection, Grand Rapids Art Museum, Grand Rapids, US
 2007 - PRICKED! EXTREME EMBROIDERY, Museum of Arts and Design, New York, United States
 2008 - Black is Beautiful, Stedelijk museum in De Nieuwe Kerk, Amsterdam, Netherlands
 2008 - Mooi niet: Works from the collection of Museum Het Domein, Gouvernement, Maastricht, Netherlands
 2009 - Gagarin; the Artists in their own words (The First Decade), SMAK, Ghent, Belgium
 2009 - Towing the Line, Drawing Space (40 Dutch artists defining the moment in Holland), White Box, New York, United States
 2010 - Declared Unobscene, Glasmuseum, Leerdam, Netherlands
 2010 - Een mooi ding, Museum Hilversum, Netherlands
 2010 - Just love me, Mudam, Luxembourg
 2011 - I promise to love you, Caldic Collection, Kunsthal, Rotterdam, Netherlands
 2011 - Valéry Proust Museum / White Cube Fever, Mu.ZEE, Ostend, Belgium
 2012 - Parelen in de Kunst, Museum de Lakenhal, Leiden, Netherlands
 2013 - Dread - Fear in the age of technological acceleration, Museum De Hallen, Haarlem, Netherlands
 2013 - Hand Made: lang leve het ambacht, Museum Boijmans Van Beuningen, Rotterdam, Netherlands
 2013 - Kanaal 2013, Gemeentemuseum Helmond, Netherlands
 2013 - The Studio and The Studio, i.c.w. Juha van 't Zelfde, Het Nieuwe Instituut, Rotterdam, Netherlands
 2013 - Wit – photography, art, design, fashion, film, Netherlands Photo Museum, Rotterdam, Netherlands
 2014 - Threads. Textile in art & design, Museum voor Moderne Kunst Arnhem, Netherlands

References

External links

RKD profile Berend Strik
Tilton Gallery, New York, USA
Galerie Fons Welters, Amsterdam, The Netherlands
Stephane Simoens Contemporary fine art, Knokke-Zoute, Belgium

Dutch contemporary artists
Artists from Amsterdam